Mark Twain (1835–1910) was an American writer.

Mark Twain may also refer to:

Places
 Mark Twain (crater), a crater on Mercury
 2362 Mark Twain, a main-belt asteroid
 Mark Twain, St. Louis, a neighborhood of St. Louis, Missouri, U.S.

Art, entertainment, and media
 Mark Twain (film), a 2001 biographical documentary by Ken Burns
 Mark Twain, a Disney riverboat attraction at multiple theme parks
 Mark Twain: The Musical (1987), a stage musical biography by Jane Iredale and William P. Perry
 Mark Twain: Words & Music (2001), a music and spoken-word album

Other uses
 The "Mark Twain", a prototype of the Apple IIGS 
 "Mark twain", a nautical term related to the practice of depth sounding

See also